Notogramma cactipeodes is a species of ulidiid or picture-winged fly in the genus Notogramma of the family Tephritidae.

References

Ulidiidae